Merete Ahnfeldt-Mollerup   (born 1963) is a Danish architect, university professor and writer about architecture. Associate professor of Kunstakademiets Arkitektskole, she has authored numerous articles, papers and books. She is a member of the Danish Royal Academy and the Danish Centre for Design Research.

Awards
She received the N. L. Høyen Medal in 2005.

See also
List of Danish architects

References

External links
Danish Centre for Design Research page

Danish architects
1963 births
Living people
Danish women writers